Surrender Your Poppy Field is the 30th studio album by American rock band Guided by Voices.

Track listing

Personnel

Guided by Voices 

 Robert Pollard – lead vocals
 Doug Gillard – guitar, backing vocals, string arrangement
 Kevin March – drums, backing vocals
 Mark Shue – bass guitar, backing vocals
 Bobby Bare Jr. – guitar, backing vocals

Additional musicians 

 Abby Shue – vocals (track 9)

Technical 

 Travis Harrison – engineering
 Ray Ketchum – engineering
 Vince Williams – art direction
 Sarah Zade-Pollard – art direction
 Jamal Ruhe – mastering
 Jeff Powell – mastering
 Robert Pollard – artwork, layout

References 

2020 albums
Guided by Voices albums